Compensatory lengthening in phonology and historical linguistics is the lengthening of a vowel sound that happens upon the loss of a following consonant, usually in the syllable coda, or of a vowel in an adjacent syllable. Lengthening triggered by consonant loss may be considered an extreme form of fusion (Crowley 1997:46). Both types may arise from speakers' attempts to preserve a word's moraic count.

Examples

English
An example from the history of English is the lengthening of vowels that happened when the voiceless velar fricative  and its palatal allophone  were lost from the language. (Later the  became  by the Great Vowel Shift.)

Both the Germanic spirant law and the Ingvaeonic nasal spirant law show vowel lengthening compensating for the loss of a nasal.

Non-rhotic forms of English have a lengthened vowel before a historical post-vocalic : in Scottish English, girl has a short  followed by a light alveolar , as presumably it did in Middle English; in Southern British English, the  has dropped out of the spoken form and the vowel has become a "long schwa" .

Classical Hebrew and Aramaic

Compensatory lengthening in Classical Hebrew and Aramaic is dependent on the class of consonant which follows the prefix (definite article in Hebrew and prefix waw-hahipukh in both languages).

E.g. (using the Hebrew definite article [hey with pataḥ plus dagesh in following consonant]):
 Before  and  it is usually [hey with qametz].
 Before  and  it is usually [hey with pataḥ]. If it is pretonic it may be [hey with qametz].
 But when it is propretonic, whatever the guttural, it will usually be [hey with segol].

Ancient Greek
Compensatory lengthening is very common in Ancient Greek. It is particularly notable in forms where n or nt comes together with s, y (= ι̯), or i. The development of nt + y was perhaps thus:

 *mont-yă → montsa (palatalization ty → ts) → mõtsa (nasalization and vowel lengthening) → mõssa → mõsa (shortening ss → s) → mōsa (denasalization, retention of long vowel) = μοῦσα "muse"

Forms with this type of compensatory lengthening include the nominative singular and dative plural of many participles, adjectives, and nouns, the 3rd person plural ending for present and future active of all verbs, and the 3rd person singular present of athematic verbs:

 *πάντ-ς → πᾶς "every, whole" (masculine nominative singular)
 *πάντ-ι̯ᾰ → *πάντσα → πᾶσα (feminine)
 *πάντ-σι → πᾶσι (masculine/neuter dative plural)
compare παντ-ός (m./n. genitive singular)
 *όντ-ι̯ᾰ → *όντσα → οὖσα participle "being" (feminine nominative singular)
 *οντ-ίᾱ → *ονσία → οὐσία "property, essence"
compare ὀντ-ός (m./n. genitive singular, from participle ὤν "being",)
Doric ἄγ-ο-ντι → ἄγοντσι → Attic/Ionic ἄγουσι "they drive"
Doric φα-ντί → *φαντσί → Attic/Ionic φᾱσί "they say"

Indo-Aryan languages 
In the evolution of the modern Indo-Aryan languages, there is a first stage in which consonant clusters with dissimilar consonants preceded by a short vowel undergo assimilation resulting in consonant clusters with similar consonants. In the second stage, the first consonant of the cluster or geminate was lost, which was accompanied by the lengthening of that vowel and sometimes additional nasalization. In Punjabi, only the first stage occurred, while most of the other modern Indo-Aryan languages underwent the second stage as well.

Maltese 
The phonemes //, //, and // were all vowelised in Maltese during a period spanning from the 18th to 20th centuries (except in word-final position where they were generally merged with //). These vowelised consonants lengthen adjacent short vowels, i.e. both preceding and following ones. For example, jagħmel ("he does"), formerly , now pronounced , and jitgħallem ("he learns"), formerly , now pronounced .

Turkish 

The voiced velar fricative, has undergone a sound change in Turkish by which the consonant was completely lost and compensatory lengthening of the preceding vowel occurred. Even though the sound has been completely lost in standard Turkish, the sound change is not yet complete in some Turkish dialects and the corresponding velar fricative found in cognate words in the closely related Azerbaijani language and the Turkish-influenced Crimean Tatar language. The previous consonantal nature of the sound is evinced by earlier English loanwords from Turkish, such as yogurt/yoghurt (modern Turkish yoğurt) and agha (modern Turkish ağa).

In modern Turkish, Ğ is used either as a silent letter indicating a syllable break or as a vowel lengthener for the preceding sound.

See also
 Mora
 Phonological history of the English language
 Ancient Greek nouns

Notes

References
Crowley, Terry. (1997) An Introduction to Historical Linguistics. 3rd edition. Oxford University Press.
Smyth, Greek Grammar on CCEL.

Historical linguistics
Phonology
Vowel shifts